Marcelina Vahekeni (born on November 2, 1990) is an Angolan model and beauty pageant titleholder who was crowned Miss Angola 2011 and represented her country in the 2012 Miss Universe pageant.

Miss Angola
Miss Cunene, Marcelina Vahekeni was crowned Miss Angola 2011, by Leila Lopes, Miss Universe 2011 who had the honor of delivering the crown on Saturday, 3 December at the gala teve place in the Conference Center of Fine in Luanda.

Miss Universe 2012
Marcelina Vahekeni represented Angola in Miss Universe 2012 held in Las Vegas. Her appearance in her national costume, which included a traditional bare breasted Angolan woman, was displayed in Time Magazine's Style section.

References

External links
 Official Miss Angola website

1990 births
Living people
Miss Angola winners
Angolan beauty pageant winners
Angolan female models
Miss Universe 2012 contestants
People from Cunene Province